Leptis Magna Museum is an archaeological museum located in Khoms (Leptis Magna), Tripolitania, Libya.

It contains evidence of people of different origins that once inhabited the city of leptis magna, including Berber, Punic, Phoenicians and Romans.

The remains preserved in the museum include statues of characters from numerous classical mythologies such as Zeus and Apollo statues. Adding to that tools and objects that show their day-to-day life habits such as metal work, pottery and jewelry.

 List of museums in Libya

References 

Museums with year of establishment missing
Tripolitania
Archaeological museums in Libya